Object-Oriented Fortran is an object-oriented extension of Fortran, in which data items can be grouped into objects, which can be instantiated and executed in parallel.

It was available for Sun, Iris, iPSC, and nCUBE, but is no longer supported.

Fortran programming language family